The 1992 Supercopa de España was two-leg Spanish football matches played on 28 October and 11 November 1992. It contested by Atlético Madrid, who were Spanish Cup winners in 1991–92, and Barcelona, who won the 1991–92 Spanish League. Barcelona won 5–2 on aggregate.

Match details

First leg

Second leg

References
 List of Super Cup Finals 1992 RSSSF.com

Supercopa de Espana Final
Supercopa de España
Supercopa de Espana 1992
Supercopa de Espana 1992